Angels E.P. is the debut release from North Carolina-based band Whiskeytown.  The band recorded the entire EP in a single day with producer Greg Elkins just a couple of months after they had formed.  Originally released as a 7" vinyl EP in 1995 by Mood Food Records, the label re-released it two years later as Rural Free Delivery, which added four outtakes from the same recording session.

Track listing

Band & Production Credits
Ryan Adams – guitar and vocals
Caitlin Cary – fiddle and vocals
Skillet Gilmore –  drums
Steve Grothmann – bass
Phil Wandscher – guitar and vocals
 Greg Elkins – recording and engineering

References

1995 debut EPs
Whiskeytown EPs